Seidelmann may refer to:

Charlotte Seidelmann, East German sprint canoeist
Paul Kenneth Seidelmann, American astronomer
3217 Seidelmann, a main-belt asteroid named after the astronomer
Seidelmann 25, an American sailboat design
Seidelmann 37, an American sailboat design
Seidelmann 245, an American sailboat design

German-language surnames
Surnames from given names